The Joseph and Augusta Trunck Boathouse is located in Three Lakes, Wisconsin, United States. It was added to the National Register of Historic Places in 2008.

Description
The boathouse is located on a lake that is part of the noted Eagle River chain of lakes. It features a gambrel roof and rests upon fitted tree trunks driven into the sand and gravel lake bottom.

References

Boathouses in the United States
Buildings and structures completed in 1928
Buildings and structures in Oneida County, Wisconsin
National Register of Historic Places in Oneida County, Wisconsin
Boathouses on the National Register of Historic Places in Wisconsin